The 1900 Wisconsin gubernatorial election was held on November 6, 1900.

Republican nominee Robert M. La Follette defeated Democratic nominee Louis G. Bomrich with 59.83% of the vote.

General election

Candidates
Major party candidates
Louis G. Bomrich, Democratic, lawyer
Robert M. La Follette, Republican, former U.S. Congressman

Other candidates
Jabez Burritt Smith, Prohibition, lawyer, candidate for Wisconsin State Senate in 1896
Howard Tuttle, Social Democrat, candidate for Governor in 1898
Frank R. Wilke, Socialist Labor, pressman

Results

References

Bibliography
 
 
 

1900
Wisconsin
Gubernatorial